Philip Michael Thomas (born May 26, 1949) is an American actor and musician, best known for his role as detective Ricardo Tubbs on the hit 1980s TV series Miami Vice. His first notable roles were in Coonskin (1975) and opposite Irene Cara in the 1976 film Sparkle. After his success in Miami Vice, he appeared in numerous made-for-TV movies and advertisements for telephone psychic services. He served as a spokesperson for cell phone entertainment company Nextones, and also voiced the character Lance Vance in the video games Grand Theft Auto: Vice City (2002) and Grand Theft Auto: Vice City Stories (2006).

Early life
Thomas was born in Columbus, Ohio, but grew up in San Bernardino, California. He is of African American, Native American, Irish, and German descent. His father, Louis Diggs, was a plant foreman at Westinghouse. Thomas's mother was Lulu McMorris. He and his seven half brothers and sisters had the surname Thomas, which was the last name of his mother's first husband.

As a child, he acted in his church's theater group and, at age 15, while participating in the Pentecostal Delman Heights Four Square Gospel Church choir, became interested in ministry. He graduated from San Bernardino High School in 1967 and briefly worked as a janitor to save money for college. Thomas earned a scholarship to the historically Black Oakwood College in Huntsville, Alabama, where he studied religion and philosophy after high school.

After two years at Oakwood College, Thomas transferred to the University of California, Riverside. During this time, he auditioned for and won a role in the San Francisco cast of Hair, which began his acting career. Thomas ultimately quit school to pursue acting as a profession, appearing in several features during the 1970s - including the classic musical drama Sparkle (1976). His big break came in 1984, when he landed a starring role in the popular television series Miami Vice alongside Don Johnson.

Career

Acting

Miami Vice
In 1984, Thomas began playing the role of Ricardo Tubbs, an ex-NYPD police officer from the Bronx who came to Miami seeking revenge on the person who killed his brother Rafael Tubbs. In Miami he encounters another undercover cop, Sonny Crockett, who is coincidentally looking for the same person.

Thomas was reportedly paid $25,000 (equivalent to $ today) per episode for Seasons 1–2. In 1986, he was given an increase to $50,000 ($) per episode for Seasons 3–5. Johnson was paid $30,000 ($) per episode for Seasons 1-2 and $90,000 ($) per episode for Seasons 3–5.

Thomas coined the acronym "EGOT", meaning "Emmy, Grammy, Oscar, Tony", in reference to his plans for winning all four. He has not, been nominated for any of these awards, but has received a People's Choice Award and a Golden Globe nomination.

Nash Bridges
In 1997, Thomas was reunited with Don Johnson for two appearances in the police drama Nash Bridges. He played Cedrick "Rick" Hawks, a Deputy United States Marshal from Miami visiting Bridges (Johnson) in San Francisco. His first appearance was in the episode "Wild Card", and his second and final appearance was in the episode "Out of Miami", aired in 2001 during the program's final season.

Grand Theft Auto: Vice City
In 2002, Thomas performed a voice-over in the video game Grand Theft Auto: Vice City as Lance Vance, a supporting character who aids the game's protagonist, Tommy Vercetti, in several story missions, while trying to avenge his brother, Victor Vance, killed in a botched drug deal with Tommy at the beginning of the game. He reprised his role in the 2006 prequel Grand Theft Auto: Vice City Stories, which details Lance's arrival in Vice City, the beginning of his involvement in the drug business, and his relationship with Victor.

Music
In 1985, Thomas released a music album titled Living the Book of My Life under his own record label called Spaceship Records. It sold poorly and failed to produce a hit single, although Thomas produced a video for the track "Just the Way I Planned It".

Thomas performed the title song of the album during the 1985 Miami Vice episode "The Maze." The episode "Trust Fund Pirates" featured another of his songs, "La Mirada". Thomas' Miami Vice co-star Don Johnson recorded an album shortly afterward titled Heartbeat. In 1987 Thomas recorded a song called "Ever and Forever" with Argentine singer Lucía Galán of Pimpinela fame.

Thomas followed up in 1988 with a second album, Somebody. It also failed to produce a hit and sold poorly. In 1993, Thomas teamed with Kathy Rahill to compose "My, My, My, Miam...I", which was chosen as the city of Miami's theme song. That same year, Thomas teamed with Jamaican fitness instructor Sandi Morais to compose songs for a family-friendly musical titled Sacha, which enjoyed runs in south Florida and New York. The two formed the Magic Cookie Production Company. Thomas produced the music for Morais' fitness videos in 2001 and 2006.

Psychic Reader's Network
In 1994, Thomas signed an agreement with Florida-based Psychic Reader's Network (later known as Traffix, Inc.) to become the spokesman for the Philip Michael Thomas International Psychic Network. He appeared in television ads and claimed to have met the planet's premier psychics through his "world travels". He dressed similarly to his Miami Vice alter ego, even opening the ads with the phrase, "From Miami Vice to world advice!" He appeared in informercials with Eileen Brennan and Todd McKee and his daughter, Sacha Nicole, to promote the psychic line. Thomas released a cassette of music linked to his psychic business titled PMT Psychic Connection, Volume I.

Traffix replaced Thomas with Miss Cleo. Thomas sued, alleging breach of contract, and won. In 2002, a New York arbitrator awarded Thomas $1.48 million for improper use of his name and likeness and an additional $780,000 in interest.

Personal life
Thomas is a vegetarian, nonsmoker and nondrinker. In 1986, Thomas married Kassandra Green. They have five children together; in 1998 they divorced. Thomas has eleven children in total.

Filmography

Film

Television

Video games

See also
 EGOT  The acronym "EGOT" was coined by Philip Michael Thomas.

References

External links
 
 
 Fan website
 Interview with Philip Michael Thomas, 2006/03/12
 CourtTV's report of Thomas' lawsuit against Traffix, Inc.

Living people
American male film actors
American male television actors
African-American people
American people of German descent
American people of Irish descent
American people who self-identify as being of Native American descent
Male actors from Columbus, Ohio
20th-century American male actors
21st-century American male actors
Actors from San Bernardino, California
Janitors
1949 births
20th-century African-American people
21st-century African-American people